A cottage hospital is a semi-obsolete type of small hospital, most commonly found in the United Kingdom.
The original concept was a small rural building having several beds. The advantages of such a hospital in villages were the provision of care which avoided long journeys to county or voluntary hospitals, facilities to deal more immediately with emergencies, and familiarity the local physician might have with their patients that may affect their treatment. This local knowledge of the patient would probably have been lost had they been referred to their nearest county hospital, as was typical for poorer patients.

Some of these buildings continued to be known as cottage hospitals until recent times. In particular, several are still recognisable in Scotland within the infrastructure of NHS Grampian, Kirkcudbrightshire, Dumfries & Galloway, and in Norfolk and Suffolk in England, an example being the Aldeburgh Cottage Hospital, which is still working as a traditional cottage hospital. The term community hospital is now applied to most of these buildings where they are used to deliver healthcare, reflecting the wider range of services that are provided in more modern times.

Background 

Following King Henry VIII's Dissolution of the Monasteries in 1536-40, only a few hospitals remained in use: St Thomas', St Bartholomew's, the Bethlehem Hospital for the insane and two lock hospitals for the treatment of syphilis. From the mid-16th century until the Voluntary Hospital Movement in the early part of the 18th century there was a dearth of hospital care in the UK.

The first voluntary hospital created to provide free care through the philanthropic action of doctors and surgeons for the ill poor was the French Hospital in Finsbury, London, started in 1718 by Huguenot immigrants.  The movement developed with the opening of Westminster Hospital near St James's Park. This was followed by the commissioning of St George's Hospital at Hyde Park Corner. Over the next 50 years, voluntary hospitals were built across the UK with a larger number in the south of England, although one of the largest voluntary hospitals opened in Edinburgh in 1729. Funding was problematic in the early years as the development of voluntary hospitals competed with government, county and local funding for the provision of care under the Poor Law Acts of 1722 and 1782. The County Hospitals received enormous public charity support. Alongside these care facilities were dispensaries.

Accommodated in a single building, they provided what is now called out-patient and day-patient care. Medicines (termed ‘physics’) were prescribed, and minor surgical procedures as well as cupping and bleeding were carried out, the patient returning to their home after treatment.

History 

In 1818 the village surgeon, Mr. Henry Lilley Smith opened a dispensary in Southam, Warwickshire. This comprised an 8 bed-roomed cottage with 4 beds. It was for the use of manual labourers and their families. Except in name this facility fulfills the broad definition of a cottage hospital. p20

In 1827 Sir Astley Cooper converted some cottages at Piccotts End, close to Hemel Hempstead, into the first cottage hospital providing free medical services.

1842 saw the commissioning of a cottage hospital in Wellow, Nottinghamshire with six beds and managed by a board which included many eminent gentlemen. Mr. W Squire Ward was the surgeon on its inception and remained so for 25 years. One nurse was employed with occasional assistance and a wide range of surgical interventions were successfully carried out. p21

Between 1855 and 1898, 294 cottage hospitals were established.

In 1859 Albert Napper converted a small cottage into a hospital in the village of Cranleigh in Surrey. This hospital opened because Napper was concerned that there were no local hospital facilities for the poor in the village. St Thomas’ Hospital was the nearest voluntary hospital and that was about 45 kilometres away on unmade roads, a dangerous journey for an ill person. The only other possibility for care was in a local workhouse infirmary but this was some 12 kilometres away in Guildford, had no trained nurses and carried the real (at that time) risk of the patient being stigmatized as a pauper. The third possibility was to stay at home; in those days and for poor people this condition is indicated by Horace Swete, a village surgeon in Wrington in Somerset, UK, in his book of 1870.

The moneyed class could afford much better conditions and treatment in private hospital without the risk of loss of employment, a slide in poverty or worse.

Albert Napper's sympathy for the poorer classes was shared by the Reverend JH Sapte, Rector of Cranley (as the name was than spelled) and they fostered the idea of finding some accommodation for the care and nursing of the ill poor. Then an occurrence of a single incident is recorded by Swete as being the catalyst for the development of the cottage hospital.  Sapte was riding across the common in Cranley when he heard of a serious accident. The victim had been carried to a nearby cottage and when Sapte arrived he found Napper and two assistants amputating the leg of the injured man. This incident confirmed for both men the need for some local facility where sick or injured people could receive urgent care. Sapte made a cottage available, rent-free, which after being whitewashed and simply furnished opened after a few weeks as the first cottage hospital.

That same cottage still exists today at the entrance to Cranleigh Village Hospital.

Napper proceeded to admit local patients to the Village Hospital, as it was called, and kept records from the start. Among the first 100 patients he recorded "compound fracture of both bones in the leg", "extensive cicatrix from a burn", "chronic pneumonia in both lungs", "multiple injuries" and amputation of fingers in a boy".

Examples 

 Turriff Cottage Hospital
 Ruth Lancaster James Hospital, Alston, Cumbria
 Fleming Cottage Hospital, Aberlour, Morayshire.
 Stephen Cottage Hospital
 Wells Cottage Hospital, Norfolk
 Castle Douglas Cottage Hospital
 Lochmaben Hospital, Dumfries and Galloway
 Cottage Hospital, Grosse Pointe Farms, Michigan
 Swanage Cottage Hospital, Dorset, UK
 Stretford Memorial Hospital (formerly the Stretford Practitioners' Hospital) was in its early days a cottage hospital used for women and children only.
 Harlington, Harmondsworth and Cranford Cottage Hospital, Middlesex.
 Aldeburgh Cottage Hospital

 Nantucket Cottage Hospital, Nantucket Island, Massachusetts
 Cottage Hospitals in Newfoundland, Canada

References

External links 

Images of England, Definition of Cottage Hospital
Cottage Hospitals - Editorial, Submitted by Alan Longbottom. Original source The Builder 1868 Vol XXVI pp145. 29 February 1868
Wells Cottage Hospital

1827 establishments
 
History of medicine in the United Kingdom